Karvansara (also Romanized as Kārvānsarā) is a village in Gazin Rural District, Raghiveh District, Haftgel County, Khuzestan Province, Iran. At the 2006 census, its population was 106, in 21 families.

References 

Populated places in Haftkel County